Gorgor or Gor Gor may refer to:
Gorgor District, in Peru
Gor Gor, Khuzestan, a village in Iran
Gor Gor, Shadegan, a village in Khuzestan Province, Iran
"Gor-Gor", a song by GWAR from America Must Be Destroyed

See also
Gargar (disambiguation)